This is the list of awards and nominations received by Carl Cox, whose career in electronic dance music both as a DJ, remixer and music producer has spanned over 30 years. He has been nominated for 76 competitive awards and won 26, including 16 DJ Awards, 5 International Dance Music Award's, 3 DJ Mag Award's and 1 NME Award.

DJ Awards
The DJ Awards organizes the annual electronic music DJ awards event it is the only international ceremony for DJs and also the oldest, the awards are held once a year at Pacha club in Ibiza Spain it is one of the most important accolades an artist can win or be honoured by.

Cox has won the Best International DJ Award six times, the Best Techno DJ Award seven times, the Best Ibiza Club Night one time and has received a record 35 consecutive nominations since the awards began in 1998.

|-
| 1998
| Carl Cox
| Best Techno/Trance DJ 
| 
|-
| 1999
| Carl Cox
| Best Techno DJ 
| 
|-
| 2000
| Carl Cox
| Best Techno DJ 
| 
|-
| 2000
| Carl Cox
| Best Set of the Season 
| 
|-
| 2001
| Carl Cox
| Best Techno DJ 
| 
|-
| 2002
| Carl Cox
| Best Techno DJ
| 
|-
| 2003
| Carl Cox
| Best Techno DJ
| 
|-
| 2004
| Carl Cox
| Best Techno DJ
| 
|-
| 2005
| Carl Cox
| Best Techno DJ
| 
|-
| 2006
| Carl Cox Global @ Space
| Best Ibiza Night
| 
|-
| 2006
| Carl Cox
| Best Techno DJ
| 
|-
| 2007
| Carl Cox
| Best Techno DJ
| 
|-
| 2008
| Carl Cox
| Best International DJ
| 
|-
| 2008
| Carl Cox
| Best Techno DJ
| 
|-
| 2009
| Carl Cox
| Best International DJ
| 
|-
| 2009
| Carl Cox
| Best Techno DJ
| 
|-
| 2010
| Carl Cox
| Best International DJ
| 
|-
| 2010
| Carl Cox
| Best Techno DJ
| 
|-
| 2011
| Carl Cox
| Best International DJ
| 
|-
| 2011
| Carl Cox
| Best Techno DJ
| 
|-
| 2011
| Carl Cox
| Best Ibiza Night
| 
|-
| 2012
| Carl Cox
| Best International DJ
| 
|-
| 2012
| Carl Cox
| Best Techno DJ
| 
|-
| 2013
| Carl Cox
| Best International DJ
| 
|-
| 2013
| Carl Cox
| Best Techno DJ
| 
|-
| 2014
| Carl Cox
| Best International DJ
| 
|-
| 2014 
| Carl Cox
| Best Techno DJ 
| 
|-
| 2015
| Carl Cox
| Best International DJ
| 
|-
| 2015
| Carl Cox
| Best Techno DJ 
| 
|-
| 2016 
| Carl Cox
| Best Techno DJ 
| 
|-
| 2016 
| Carl Cox
| Best International DJ 
| 
|-
| 2017 
| Carl Cox
| Best Techno DJ 
| 
|-
| 2018 
| Carl Cox
| Best International DJ 
| 
|-
| 2019 
| Carl Cox
| Best International DJ 
| 
|-

DJ Magazine Awards
Artists are nominated to the DJ Magazine Top 100 DJ's list each year the public votes to decide who they rank as the World's No 1 DJ at the end of the poll. Cox was ranked as the World's No 1 DJ in 1996 and 1997 he ranked in the top 5 for 6 years, the top 10 for 10 years and the top 20 for 14 years.

|-
| 1996
| Carl Cox
| World's Top 100 DJs
| 
|-
| 1997
| Carl Cox
| World's Top 100 DJs
| 
|-
| 1998
| Carl Cox
| World's Top 100 DJs
| 
|-
| 1999
| Carl Cox
| World's Top 100 DJs
| 
|-
| 2000
| Carl Cox
| World's Top 100 DJs
| style="text-align:center;"| 5
|-
| 2001
| Carl Cox
| World's Top 100 DJs
| style="text-align:center;"| 5
|-
| 2002
| Carl Cox
| World's Top 100 DJs
| style="text-align:center;"| 8
|-
| 2003
| Carl Cox
| World's Top 100 DJs
| style="text-align:center;"| 9
|-
| 2004
| Carl Cox
| World's Top 100 DJs
| style="text-align:center;"| 11
|-
| 2005
| Carl Cox
| World's Top 100 DJs
| style="text-align:center;"| 10
|-
| 2006
| Carl Cox
| World's Top 100 DJs
| style="text-align:center;"| 11
|-
| 2007
| Carl Cox
| World's Top 100 DJs
| style="text-align:center;"| 7
|-
|-
| 2008
| Carl Cox
| World's Top 100 DJs
| style="text-align:center;"| 12
|-
| 2009
| Carl Cox
| World's Top 100 DJs
| style="text-align:center;"| 18
|-
| 2010
| Carl Cox
| World's Top 100 DJs
| style="text-align:center;"| 22
|-
| 2011
| Carl Cox
| World's Top 100 DJs
| style="text-align:center;"| 33
|-
| 2012
| Carl Cox
| World's Top 100 DJs
| style="text-align:center;"| 46
|-
| 2013
| Carl Cox
| World's Top 100 DJs
| style="text-align:center;"| 46
|-
| 2014
| Carl Cox
| World's Top 100 DJs
| style="text-align:center;"| 59
|-
| 2015
| Carl Cox
| World's Top 100 DJs
| style="text-align:center;"| 63
|-
| 2016
| Carl Cox
| World's Top 100 DJs
| style="text-align:center;"| 74
|-
| 2017
| Carl Cox
| World's Top 100 DJs
| style="text-align:center;"| 62
|-
| 2018
| Carl Cox
| World's Top 100 DJs
| style="text-align:center;"| 53
|-
| 2019
| Carl Cox
| World's Top 100 DJs
| style="text-align:center;"| 35
|-
| 2020
| Carl Cox
| World's Top 100 DJs
| style="text-align:center;"| 34
|-
| 2021
| Carl Cox
| World's Top 100 DJs
| style="text-align:center;"| 27
|-
| 2022
| Carl Cox
| World's Top 100 DJs
| style="text-align:center;"| 22

|-
| 1992
| Carl Cox
| No1 Rave DJ 
|

International Dance Music Awards
The International Dance Music Awards is a major event which is part of the Winter Music Conference (WMC) a weeklong electronic music conference, held every March since 1985 in Miami Beach, Florida, United States.

Cox has been nominated twelve times with five wins.

Pre-2016

|-
| 1994
| Carl Cox
| DJ of the Year 
| 
|-
| 1995
| Carl Cox
| DJ of the Year
| 
|-
|-
| 1996
| Carl Cox
| Best DJ 
| 
|-
| 2003
| Carl Cox
| Best European DJ
| 
|-
| 2006
| Carl Cox
| Best Global DJ
| 
|-
| 2007
| Carl Cox
| Best Global DJ
| 
|-
| 2008
| Carl Cox
| Best Global DJ
| 
|-
| 2009
| Carl Cox
| Best Global DJ
| 
|-
| 2014
| Carl Cox
| Best European DJ
|

2018–present

|-
| 2018
| Carl Cox
| Best Male Artist (Underground)
| 
|-
| 2019
| Carl Cox
| Best Male (Techno)
| 
|-
| 2020
| Carl Cox
| Best Male (Techno)
|

Mixmag Awards
In 2010 Mixmag selected nominations for the title of Greatest DJ of All Time the results of the worldwide public vote were announced in January 2011 Cox was ranked 5th.

|-
| 2011
| Carl Cox
| Greatest DJ of All Time
|  
|-
| 2016
| Carl Cox
| Top 20 DJ's of 2016
|

NME Awards
At the 2001 NME Award's Cox won the Best Club DJ Award

|-
| 2001
| Carl Cox
| Best Club DJ
|

Resident Advisor Awards 
Since 2008, Carl Cox has been listed on Resident Advisor's poll for the top 100 DJs of the year, which is voted on by the public.

|-
| 2008
| Carl Cox
| Best DJ 
| 
|-
| 2009
| Carl Cox
| Best DJ 
| 
|-
| 2010
| Carl Cox
| Best DJ 
| 
|-
| 2011
| Carl Cox
| Best DJ 
| 
|-
| 2012
| Carl Cox
| Best DJ 
| 
|-
| 2013
| Carl Cox
| Best DJ 
| 
|-
| 2014
| Carl Cox
| Best DJ 
| 
|-
| 2015
| Carl Cox
| Best DJ 
|

Notes

References

External links

Carl Cox